The 1966–67 Tercera División season is the 33rd since its establishment.

Group 1

Group 2

Group 3

Group 4

Group 5

Group 6/7

Group 8

Group 9

Group 10

Group 11

Group 12

Group 13

Group 14

Group 15

Playoffs

Promotion to Segunda División (champions)

First round
 Olot received a bye.

 

 

 

Match of Tiebreaker:

Second round

 

Match of Tiebreaker:

Promotion to Segunda División (runners-up)

First round

 Almería received a bye.

Second round

Match of Tiebreaker:

Final Round

External links
www.rsssf.com

Tercera División seasons
3
Spain